EHD may refer to:

 EHD protein family
 Electrohydrodynamics
 English Historical Documents, a series on English history
 Epizootic hemorrhagic disease
 European Heritage Days